is a monastery of the Myōshin-ji branch of Japanese Rinzai School of Zen Buddhism in Minokamo, Gifu Prefecture, Japan. It was originally a place of practice of Kanzan Egen Zenji in 1330. The training monastery was established at Shōgen-ji by Settan, the dharmic successor of Tōrin. Shōgen-ji's post–World War II monastic life is described concretely with the highest quality of literature in the novel Mind to Mind (1999) by author Seikan Hasegawa.

Myoshin-ji temples
Rinzai temples

References

External links